George Robert Broughton Meredith (15 July 1909 — 23 August 1994) was a British tennis player.

Born in the Leicestershire village of Hugglescote, Meredith was the son of a local doctor.

Meredith played cricket for the Dover College first eleven but couldn't pursue the sport further due to the hours he had to work in his part time retail job. Introduced to tennis by his elder sister, he became the Leicestershire junior champion as a 15-year old and was 16 when first picked for the county side, for which he later captained.

Meredith won his first open title in 1933 at the Tally Ho! tournament in Birmingham, by beating Davis Cup player Keats Lester in the final. He also made his Wimbledon singles main draw debut that year and was beaten in the first round by the tournament's top seed Ellsworth Vines.

An England representative player, Meredith had his best Wimbledon performance at the 1948 Wimbledon Championships, where he won through to the fourth round, before losing to Budge Patty.

Meredith stepped down as Managing Director of Leicester sporting goods store Sports Ltd on Belvoir Street in 1980 after working there for many years. He had three daughters with wife Margaret.

References

External links
 

1909 births
1994 deaths
British male tennis players
English male tennis players
Tennis people from Leicestershire
People from Hugglescote
People educated at Dover College
20th-century British people